Francesco Gelli (born 15 October 1996) is an Italian footballer who plays as a midfielder for  club Frosinone.

Career
In July 2017, Gelli moved to Serie C club AlbinoLeffe on a free transfer.

On 31 January 2023, Gelli signed a 1.5-year contract with Frosinone in Serie B.

References

External links
Francesco Gelli at Football Database

1996 births
Sportspeople from Livorno
Footballers from Tuscany
Living people
Italian footballers
Association football midfielders
U.S. Livorno 1915 players
A.C. Tuttocuoio 1957 San Miniato players
U.C. AlbinoLeffe players
Frosinone Calcio players
Serie C players
Serie D players